Baltimora is a genus of flowering plants in the family Asteraceae.

 Species
 Baltimora geminata - Mexico, Central America, West Indies, South America
 Baltimora recta -  beautyhead - Mexico, Central America, South America

References

Asteraceae genera
Heliantheae